Enixotrophon veronicae is a species of sea snail, a marine gastropod mollusk in the family Muricidae, the murex snails or rock snails.

Description

Distribution
This marine species occurs off Chile.

References

 Marshall B.A. & Houart R. (2011) The genus Pagodula (Mollusca: Gastropoda: Muricidae) in Australia, the New Zealand region and the Tasman Sea. New Zealand Journal of Geology and Geophysics 54(1): 89–114.

External links
 Pastorino G. (1999). A new species of gastropod of the genus Trophon Montfort, 1810 (Mollusca: Gastropoda: Muricidae) from subantarctic waters. The Veliger. 42(2): 169-174.
 Barco, A.; Marshall, B.; A. Houart, R.; Oliverio, M. (2015). Molecular phylogenetics of Haustrinae and Pagodulinae (Neogastropoda: Muricidae) with a focus on New Zealand species. Journal of Molluscan Studies. 81(4): 476-488.

Gastropods described in 1999
Endemic fauna of Chile
Enixotrophon